This is a list of archaeological sites in Chihuahua, Mexico.

Locations

See also 
 History of Chihuahua

Notes

References 
 

 
Indigenous architecture of the Americas
Pueblo
 
Religious places of the indigenous peoples of North America
Chihuahua